Erineus or Erineos, also known as Erineum or Erineon (Ἐρινεόν) was a town of Phthiotis in ancient Thessaly, mentioned by Strabo and Stephanus of Byzantium.

Its site is unlocated.

References

Populated places in ancient Thessaly
Former populated places in Greece
Lost ancient cities and towns
Achaea Phthiotis